This article lists the confirmed squads lists for badminton's 2016 Thomas & Uber Cup.

Thomas Cup

Group A

China

Japan

France

Mexico

Group B

Indonesia

India

Thailand

Hong Kong

Group C

South Korea

Malaysia

England

Germany

Group D

Denmark

Chinese Taipei

New Zealand

South Africa

Uber Cup

Group A

China

Denmark

Spain

Malaysia

Group B

South Korea

Chinese Taipei

Mauritius

United States

Group C

Thailand

Indonesia

Bulgaria

Hong Kong

Group D

Japan

India

Australia

Germany

References
 Thomas Cup Team List - BWF
 Uber Cup Team List - BWF

Squads